Dark Night may refer to:

 "Dark Is the Night" (Soviet song) ("Tyomnaya noch"), a song by Nikita Bogoslovsky 
 Dark Night (2005 film), a 2005 short film by Leonid Prudovsky
 Dark Night (2016 film), a 2016 American film
 The Dark Night (film), a 1989 Spanish film
 "Dark Night" (song), a song by The Blasters
 "The Dark Night", an episode of the TV series Gossip Girl

See also 
 Dark Night of the Soul, a metaphor for a phase of one's spiritual life
 Dark Is the Night (disambiguation)
 
 Dark Knight (disambiguation)
 Black Knight (disambiguation)
 Darkest Night (disambiguation)
 Darkest Knight
 Blackest Night